Robert Gadocha (born 10 January 1946 in Kraków) is a retired Polish soccer player, most notable for playing for Legia Warsaw.

Gadocha, who started his career in Garbarnia Kraków. later also played for FC Nantes, and briefly in the United States for Chicago Sting, his last professional team. He was a member of the Poland national team that won the gold medal at the 1972 Summer Olympics in Munich, as well as a member of the team that finished third in the 1974 FIFA World Cup in West Germany. He has a total of 16 goals in 62 games with the Poland national team.

Robert Gadocha holds the record for the most assists in a single match in World Cup finals history, assisting four goals in his team's 7–0 victory against Haiti in the group stage of the 1974 World Cup. In addition, he holds the record for the most player assists in one tournament, with five assists in the same tournament, alongside with Pelé (1970), Pierre Littbarski (1982), Diego Maradona (1986) and Thomas Hassler (1994).

In 1978, Gadocha moved to the Chicago Sting of the North American Soccer League.  He also spent one season, 1980–81, with the Hartford Hellions of the Major Indoor Soccer League.

References

External links
 
 NASL/MISL stats
 

1946 births
Living people
Chicago Sting (NASL) players
Expatriate footballers in France
Footballers at the 1972 Summer Olympics
Hartford Hellions players
Legia Warsaw players
Ligue 1 players
Major Indoor Soccer League (1978–1992) players
North American Soccer League (1968–1984) players
Olympic gold medalists for Poland
Olympic footballers of Poland
Footballers from Kraków
Polish footballers
Polish expatriate footballers
Poland international footballers
Association football midfielders
FC Nantes players
1974 FIFA World Cup players
Olympic medalists in football
Expatriate soccer players in the United States
Polish expatriate sportspeople in the United States
Medalists at the 1972 Summer Olympics
Association football forwards
Polish expatriate sportspeople in France